Nikolay Sergeyevich Averyanov (born 4 February 1980 in Chelyabinsk) is a decathlete from Russia, who competed for his native country at the 2004 Summer Olympics in Athens, Greece. He set his personal best score (8048 points) in Tula on 24 June 2004.

International competitions

Personal bests 
 100 metres - 10.65 (2004)
 400 metres - 49.70 (2004)
 1500 metres - 4:26.86 (2004)
 110 metres hurdles - 14.39 (2004)
 High jump - 1.97  (2005)
 Pole vault - 4.80 (2004)
 Long jump - 7.60 (2004)
 Shot put - 14.55 (2004)
 Discus throw - 41.72 (2004)
 Javelin throw - 55.10 (2004)
 Decathlon – 8048 (2004)

References

 
 sports-reference

1980 births
Living people
Sportspeople from Chelyabinsk
Russian decathletes
Olympic decathletes
Olympic athletes of Russia
Athletes (track and field) at the 2004 Summer Olympics
Russian Athletics Championships winners